Recuérdame is the third (3rd) studio album by Puerto Rican singer Yolandita Monge. In 1971, the singer temporarily established in México, where she recorded three albums for Teca Records.  It was released in 1971 and contains the radio hit “Recuérdame”.

The album was re-issued in the early 1990s by the label Disco Hit in cassette format.  It is currently out of print in all media layouts.

Track listing

Notes
Vocals: Yolandita Monge
Track listing and credits from album cover.
Re-released in Cassette Format by Disco Hit Productions/Aponte Latin Music Distribution (DHC-1624)

References

Yolandita Monge albums
1971 albums